The Bachelor is a 2012 Chinese family television series produced by Yujia Shixing Pictures.

The series stars Xu Zheng as a 35-year-old single man under parental pressure to get married, and detailed his romantic adventures. It is co-directed by Sun Hao, who in 2010 directed a similar series Will You Marry Me and My Family about an older woman looking for a mate. (The lead actress Song Jia also stars in The Bachelor, but as a different character.) Both series were co-written by Rao Hui, Li Xiao and Liu Shen.

The Bachelor was first broadcast on Shanghai Television in the Shanghai area on August 8, 2012, before being broadcast nationally on Anhui Television, Zhejiang Television, Shenzhen Television and various websites on October 7, 2012. In Taiwan, it was broadcast on EyeTV in 2014.

Cast
 Xu Zheng as Cao Xiaoqiang, a 35-year-old sales manager. He treats every relationship very sincerely, and women he dated all love him. 
 Zhu Yin as Cao Xiaoqiang's worrisome and overprotective mother.
 Wang Yang as Cao Xiaoqiang's father. 
 Guo Jingfei as Huang Weiye, Cao Xiaoqiang's 33-year-old best friend.
 Wang Maolei as Li Wenda, Cao Xiaoqiang's 32-year-old lazy uncle.

The candidates: 
 Mei Ting as Gu Qing, a 29-year-old Peking opera actress. 
 Cao Yuan as Wu Xiaoliu, a 22-year-old French teacher.
 Sui Lan as Ma Xiaomei, a 25-year-old from the countryside, the daughter of a family friend.
 Ma Su as Cai Weilan, a 23-year-old recent college graduate.
 Che Xiao as Xu Ruoyun, a 31-year-old Harvard-educated vice-CEO.
 Song Jia as Zhao Kai, a 33-year-old urological surgeon.
 Zhang Xinyi as Liu Chenxi, a 33-year-old divorced single mom, Cao Xiaoqiang's college love.

Ending
The drama ends with a woman's voice calling Cao Xiaoqiang's name and Cao turning his head. The identity of the voice generated much discussion in the Chinese cyber-world among fans, with people analyzing the voice of each actress that has appeared in the show. In December 2012, accepting the Favourite Male Character Award at the TV Drama Awards Made in China, Xu Zheng slyly told the crowd: "She is whomever you want her to be."

Director Sun Hao revealed that the voice was actually by actress Fan Bingbing, who happened to be paying the set a visit.

Awards and nominations
2012 TV Drama Awards Made in China
 Won - Top 10 Dramas of the Year (#10)
 Won - Favourite Male Character, Cao Xiaoqiang (portrayed by Xu Zheng)
 Nominated - Best Actor, Xu Zheng

See also
Call for Love, 2007 romantic comedy film also starring Xu Zheng as the main role looking for a wife. Song Jia was one of the actresses in the film.

References
   《大男当婚》搜狐网专题
   《大男当婚》安徽衛視专题

2012 Chinese television series debuts
2012 Chinese television series endings
Chinese romantic comedy television series
Zhejiang Television original programming